is a Nippon Professional Baseball player for the Yomiuri Giants in Japan's Central League.

When he played in Nippon Series on November 1, 2012, Kazuhito Tadano was thrown out of the game because Koichi Yanada, the umpire-in-chief in the game, judged that Tadano threw a bean ball to his face. However, replays showed that the ball did not hit his face.

References

External links

1981 births
Japanese baseball coaches
Honolulu Sharks players
Japanese expatriate baseball players in the United States
Living people
Nippon Professional Baseball catchers
Nippon Professional Baseball coaches
Baseball people from Niigata Prefecture
Yomiuri Giants players